MPAA may refer to:

Motion Picture Association of America
MPAA film rating system
My Parents Are Aliens, a British children's television sitcom
4-Mercaptophenylacetic acid